Kahriz-e Boqazi (also Romanized as Kahrīz-e Boqāzī and Kahrīz Boqāzī; also known as Kahrīz Boghāzī, Kahrizé Boghazi, and Kārīz Bukāz) is a village in Sardrud-e Olya Rural District, Sardrud District, Razan County, Hamadan Province, Iran. At the 2006 census, its population was 874, in 181 families.

References 

Populated places in Razan County